Susan Barbara "Sue" Fraser (born 15 July 1966 in Aberdeen, Scotland) is a former field hockey player from Scotland, who was a member of the British squad that won the bronze medal at the 1992 Summer Olympics in Barcelona. Four years later in Atlanta, Georgia she ended up in fourth place with the national squad. She is currently a teacher at Gowriehill Primary School in Dundee.

References

External links
 
 

1966 births
Living people
Scottish female field hockey players
Field hockey players at the 1992 Summer Olympics
Field hockey players at the 1996 Summer Olympics
Field hockey players at the 1998 Commonwealth Games
Olympic field hockey players of Great Britain
British female field hockey players
Olympic bronze medallists for Great Britain
Sportspeople from Aberdeen
Olympic medalists in field hockey
Scottish Olympic medallists
Medalists at the 1992 Summer Olympics
Commonwealth Games competitors for Scotland